Numaish Masnuāt-e-Mulki or Numaish  is an annual consumer exhibition held in Hyderabad, Telangana, India. The exhibition has remained the only event of its kind in the world to be organised at a stretch for a 46-day period at its  permanent venue in Nampally. It features joy rides, eateries and other entertainment options for the visitors.

History
Numaish Masnuāt-e-Mulki meaning Exhibition of the Local Products, was started in 1938 by a group of graduates of Osmania University to showcase local products. It was the reign of the Last Nizam of Hyderabad, Mir Osman Ali Khan. From a mere 100 stalls in 1938 started at the Public Gardens, the venue has been shifted to the Exhibition Grounds, near Nampally Railway Station. The original name was changed to All India Industrial Exhibition, and was renamed to its original name, the Numaish in 2009.

It was cancelled in 2021 and due to the COVID-19 pandemic in India by the Telangana Government,in 2022 exhibition was initially suspend Numaish in the wake of the Omicron outbreak. The Exhibition Society has decided to reschedule the nomination from the 25th of Feb 2022 month as the number of corona cases is declining and the situation is under control. It will be held every day from 4 pm to 10:30 pm. and concluded on the 8th April 2022.

Exhibition

The exhibition features dry fruits and handicrafts of Jammu and Kashmir to handmade garments from Uttar Pradesh, West Bengal and Madhya Pradesh, handicraft items from all over India and electronic goods of the best brands in the country. There are special stalls organized by different ladies groups, convicts and much more. The exhibition also featured carpets of Iran and some stalls from Pakistan till 2011. But due to diplomatic reasons they will not be available from 2012. The Hyderabadi haleem is sold by Hyderabadi restaurant Pista House at the exhibition.

There are three entry points: Gate No. 1 (Gandhi Bhavan Gate), Gate No. 2 (Ajanta Gate), Gate No.3 (Goshamahal Gate). The Ajanta Gate is the  main entrance and the biggest.

Entry and parking
For entry to the exhibition, INR30 is charged per head.

From 2012, car parking is provided with fixed Rs 50 as fee for four-wheelers and Rs 20 for two-wheelers.  Besides, there is a lot of parking space inside the exhibition grounds. Vehicles are allowed entry till 4 pm. Another official parking space has been identified on the premises of Government Junior College, Nampally (opposite Gandhi Bhavan) Still there are incidents of duping people in name of car parking. The miscreants who have leased out the open grounds near the exhibition charge Rs 50 for a four-wheeler and Rs 20 for a two-wheeler.

Surveillance
75 CCTVs, a three-tier security system has been put in place while door-frame-metal detectors have been installed at the three entry locations. Apart from these, watch and ward are on duty till 9 pm everyday during the exhibition. Live video streaming of the Numaish with the help of two tilt and zoom cameras is posted on the internet. From 2012, Geographical Information System (GIS) has been used to allot the stalls based on the availability of the space in the grounds.

Revenue 

In 2011, about 21 lakh people visited the exhibition and the society collected a revenue of Rs 13 crore.

Cultural programs
Several cultural programs are conducted in the Exhibition Club during the 46-day period that include classical and popular musical concerts, magic shows, mushaira (poetry) etc. In recent times Bollywood and Tollywood artists have also performed during the Numaish.

The 75th edition of the Numaish inaugurated on 1/1/2015 saw many special programs in Telugu and Urdu including performances by Tollywood artists as well as special Ghazal programs and Comedy programs that have been attended in large numbers by visitors. The newly renovated club hall was the venue for a special tribute to Legendary poets of Urdu performed by top ghazal singers of Hyderabad. This was a rare occasion where so many well known ghazal singers got together and performed on the same stage. Some of the poets whose ghazals were presented are Ghalib, Iqbal, Mir Taqi Mir, Faiz Ahmed Faiz, Ibn-E-Insha and more.

Games will be available from 6pm onwards.

The Legendary Indian Artist, Padma Bhushan Awardee S.P. Balasubramanium was felicitated by the Exhibition Society on 8 February 2015 in a Grand Program arranged by the Society's Club and Reception Sub-Committee. The President of the society, Eatala Rajender, Telangana Minister for Finance, did the honors along with the other office bearers of the society. S.P Balasubramanium spoke and praised the services being rendered by the Exhibition Society. He also performed a few of his numbers along with a number of other Telugu Film Industry singers who came and performed as a tribute to Balu Sir (as he's fondly addressed).

Transport
Numaish  Exhibition Grounds can be reached from Gandhi Bhavan metro station and Nampally Metro Station.

References

External links

Trade fairs in India
Events in Hyderabad, India
Culture of Telangana